Eamonn Thomas Martin (born 9 October 1958 in Basildon, Essex) is an English former elite long distance runner.

Athletics career
Martin is the most recent British male winner of the London Marathon, where he recorded a time of 2:10:50, winning the 1993 race in a sprint finish against the Mexican athlete Isidro Rico. The race was Martin's debut marathon and he went on to win the Chicago Marathon in 1995, in a time of 2:11:18.

As a junior, Martin won a national title at the English Schools Athletics Association Cross-Country Championships in 1973 ahead of runner-up Steve Ovett. He went on to compete at the top level in track, cross country, and road racing. He was the National Cross-Country Champion in 1984 and 1992 and he won the Belfast International Cross Country race in 1991. He competed at the 1984 and 1988 Summer Olympics, finishing thirteenth in the 5000-metre final in 1984, and dropping out of the 10,000-metre final in 1988.

He represented England at the 1990 Commonwealth Games in Auckland, New Zealand, winning a gold medal in the 10,000 metres event in a time of 28:08.56. Four years later he represented England at the 1994 Commonwealth Games in Victoria, British Columbia, Canada.

Personal life
Martin currently works for HORIBA MIRA Ltd., and formerly worked for Ford. In 1993, his son, also called Eamonn, was born. His daughters, Lydia born 1986, and Rose born 1989, are active runners.

International competitions

Professional marathons

References

External links 
 
 
 
  Senior men’s winners of the English National Cross-country Championships

1958 births
Living people
Sportspeople from Basildon
English male marathon runners
Olympic athletes of Great Britain
Athletes (track and field) at the 1984 Summer Olympics
Athletes (track and field) at the 1988 Summer Olympics
Athletes (track and field) at the 1992 Summer Olympics
Commonwealth Games gold medallists for England
Commonwealth Games medallists in athletics
Athletes (track and field) at the 1990 Commonwealth Games
Athletes (track and field) at the 1994 Commonwealth Games
World Athletics Championships athletes for Great Britain
Chicago Marathon male winners
London Marathon male winners
Medallists at the 1990 Commonwealth Games